The Long Beach State Beach men's basketball team represents California State University, Long Beach in Long Beach, California. The school's team competes in the Big West Conference. The team last played in the NCAA Division I men's basketball tournament in 2012. The Beach are currently coached by Dan Monson. Long Beach State officially changed their nickname with the NCAA to "Beach" from "49ers" prior to the 2019–20 season.

In the 2006–07 season, the 49ers finished with a 24–8 (12–2) record, the Big West conference championship, and the school's first trip to the NCAA tournament in 12 years. Star guard Aaron Nixon was named Big West player of the year, as well as being selected as an AP Honorable Mention All-American.

In 2008, the team began a three-year probation term, vacated 18 victories from their 2005–2006 season, and reduced scholarships and recruiting in order to keep eligibility for postseason play.

Post season results

NCAA tournament results
Long Beach State has appeared in nine NCAA tournaments. Their combined record is 7–10.

 vacated by NCAA

NIT results
Long Beach State has appeared in nine National Invitation Tournaments (NIT). Their combined record is 2–9.

Beach in the NBA

The following former Long Beach State players have played professionally for the National Basketball Association:

Retired numbers 

Four numbers have been retired in Long Beach State basketball history:

References

External links